Jarryd Roughead (born 23 January 1987) is an Australian rules football coach and former player. He is currently an assistant coach with the St Kilda Football Club in the Australian Football League (AFL). He played for the Hawthorn Football Club in the AFL and was the club's captain from 2017 until his retirement in 2019.

Early and personal life
Born in Leongatha in southern Gippsland, Roughead played for the Gippsland Power. After the under 18s season finished, Roughead helped his local team, Leongatha, win the WGLFL premiership.

Roughead is friends with Australian basketball players Joe Ingles and Patty Mills.

His cousin Jordan Roughead played for the Collingwood Football Club.

Roughead is married and has a daughter.

AFL career

2004-2007: Introduction to senior football 
Roughead was recruited to Hawthorn with the 2nd overall pick in the 2004 AFL draft. he was selected by Hawthorn along with future dual-club superstar Lance Franklin. Both Roughead and Franklin were to be key members of Hawthorn's line up as they grew older.

In Round 19, 2005, Roughhead was nominated for the AFL Rising Star award. He collected 20 disposals in a 41-point loss against the Brisbane Lions.

2007-2009: Hitting form 
In 2007, Roughhead finished the season with a career-high of 40 goals in 22 games. However, along with his 40 majors, Roughead's goal accuracy was at  52.6 percent that year, a mark considered to not be very good.

During his career, Roughhead has shown that he has the tremendous athletic capability with a huge leap and clean marking hands. In the 2008 AFL season, he kicked 75 goals from 25 matches. Despite having the ability to work as a member of Hawthorn's defence, he became a regular center half-forward for Hawthorn.

In 2008, he played in his first AFL Grand Final, despite his struggles to collect the ball at times, Roughead finished the match with a respectable 2 goals against Geelong.

Roughhead kicked a career-high 8 goals in a slim 5 point victory over the Carlton Blues.

2011-2012: Injuries 
In 2011, Roughhead played in a ruck position as well as the forward line due to Hawthorn's injury list. In their Round 12 clash against Geelong, he ruptured his Achilles tendon during the final quarter of the match. Roughead was stretchered off the ground and was ruled out for the remainder of the 2011 AFL season. He finished the season with 16 goals.

He spent the majority of the 2012 AFL season sharing the ruck duties with David Hale (footballer). When not in the ruck, he was position in the forward line, but also assisted in defence as the need arose.

2013-2015: Medals and premierships 
In 2013, Roughead was awarded the Coleman Medal for being the leading goalkicker after kicking 68 goals at the completion of the home and away season. He managed to achieve this whilst spending considerable time in the ruck as well as in the midfield alongside his rucking partners.

He kicked two goals in Hawthorn's qualifying final against Sydney and another two goals in the  AFL Grand Final against Fremantle which resulted in Hawthorn's second premiership of the century.

Following 2013, Roughhead was a member of Hawthorn's Grand Final winning sides in 2014 and 2015, notably kicking 5 goals against the Sydney Swans in the 2014 Grand Final.

2016-2019: Career conclusion 
Roughhead missed most of the 2016 AFL season due to cancer complications.

On 20 January 2017, Roughead was named the captain of Hawthorn.

On 12 August 2019, Roughead announced he would retire from AFL football at the conclusion of the 2019 season. In his last match, he kicked 6 goals against the Gold Coast Suns.

Illness
Midway through the 2015 season, Roughead was ruled out for three weeks after it was revealed he had a melanoma removed from his lip.
On May 17, 2016, Roughead was diagnosed with a recurrence of Melanoma and was sidelined indefinitely. Roughead has four small spots on his lung and a biopsy confirmed a diagnosis of melanoma. In December, after 8 months of immunotherapy, Roughead revealed on the Hawthorn website that he was cancer-free, and had been given the all-clear to return to football.

Statistics

|- style=background:#EAEAEA
| 2005 ||  || 35
| 16 || 6 || 5 || 104 || 79 || 183 || 66 || 10 || 8 || 0.4 || 0.3 || 6.5 || 4.9 || 11.4 || 4.1 || 0.6 || 0.5 || 0
|-
| 2006 ||  || 2
| 20 || 12 || 5 || 151 || 108 || 259 || 108 || 29 || 4 || 0.6 || 0.3 || 7.6 || 5.4 || 13.0 || 5.4 || 1.5 || 0.2 || 0
|- style=background:#EAEAEA
| 2007 ||  || 2
| 22 || 40 || 36 || 117 || 85 || 202 || 77 || 29 || 37 || 1.8 || 1.6 || 5.3 || 3.9 || 9.2 || 3.5 || 1.3 || 1.7 || 2
|-
| bgcolor=F0E68C | 2008# ||  || 2
| 25 || 75 || 51 || 223 || 100 || 323 || 147 || 50 || 33 || 3.0 || 2.0 || 8.9 || 4.0 || 12.9 || 5.9 || 2.0 || 1.3 || 7
|- style=background:#EAEAEA
| 2009 ||  || 2
| 19 || 51 || 27 || 150 || 93 || 243 || 87 || 40 || 39 || 2.7 || 1.4 || 7.9 || 4.9 || 12.8 || 4.6 || 2.1 || 2.1 || 4
|-
| 2010 ||  || 2
| 23 || 53 || bgcolor=CAE1FF | 46† || 192 || 94 || 286 || 114 || 43 || 28 || 2.3 || 2.0 || 8.3 || 4.1 || 12.4 || 5.0 || 1.9 || 1.2 || 0
|- style=background:#EAEAEA
| 2011 ||  || 2
| 11 || 16 || 6 || 104 || 72 || 176 || 52 || 44 || 83 || 1.5 || 0.5 || 9.5 || 6.5 || 16.0 || 4.7 || 4.0 || 7.5 || 0
|-
| 2012 ||  || 2
| 23 || 41 || 28 || 227 || 165 || 392 || 105 || 64 || 222 || 1.8 || 1.2 || 9.9 || 7.2 || 17.0 || 4.6 || 2.8 || 9.7 || 4
|- style="background:#EAEAEA
| bgcolor=F0E68C | 2013# ||  || 2
| 25 || bgcolor=CAE1FF | 72† || 34 || 259 || 144 || 403 || 112 || 58 || 60 || 2.9 || 1.4 || 10.4 || 5.8 || 16.1 || 4.5 || 2.3 || 2.4 || 13
|-
| bgcolor=F0E68C | 2014# ||  || 2
| 23 || 75 || 43 || 247 || 120 || 367 || 107 || 68 || 17 || 3.3 || 1.9 || 10.7 || 5.2 || 16.0 || 4.7 || 3.0 || 0.7 || 11
|- style=background:#EAEAEA
| bgcolor=F0E68C | 2015# ||  || 2
| 24 || 50 || 34 || 263 || 201 || 464 || 120 || 76 || 20 || 2.1 || 1.4 || 11.0 || 8.3 || 19.3 || 5.0 || 3.2 || 0.8 || 9
|-
| 2016 ||  || 2
| 0 || — || — || — || — || — || — || — || — || — || — || — || — || — || — || — || — || —
|- style=background:#EAEAEA
| 2017 ||  || 2
| 22 || 38 || 21 || 193 || 199 || 392 || 109 || 75 || 27 || 1.7 || 1.0 || 8.8 || 9.0 || 17.9 || 5.0 || 3.4 || 1.2 || 6
|-
| 2018 ||  || 2
| 22 || 34 || 24 || 189 || 147 || 336 || 88 || 58 || 67 || 1.5 || 1.1 || 8.6 || 6.7 || 15.3 || 4.0 || 2.6 || 3.0 || 1
|- style=background:#EAEAEA
| 2019 ||  || 2
| 8 || 15 || 10 || 60 || 39 || 99 || 28 || 19 || 19 || 1.9 || 1.3 || 7.5 || 4.9 || 12.4 || 3.5 || 2.4 || 2.4 || 2
|- class="sortbottom"
! colspan=3| Career
! 283 !! 578 !! 370 !! 2479 !! 1646 !! 4125 !! 1320 !! 663 !! 664 !! 2.0 !! 1.3 !! 8.8 !! 5.8 !! 14.6 !! 4.7 !! 2.3 !! 2.3 !! 59
|}

Honours and achievements
Team
 4× AFL premiership player: 2008, 2013, 2014, 2015
 2× Minor premiership: 2012, 2013

Individual
 Coleman Medal: 2013
 2× All-Australian team: 2013, 2014
 3× Hawthorn leading goalkicker: 2013, 2014, 2017
 Hawthorn captain: 2017–2018
 Australia international rules football team: 2015
 Hawthorn most consistent player: 2008
 AFL Rising Star nominee: 2005
 Hawthorn life member

Publications
in 2020, Roughead, assisted by sports journalist Peter Hanlon, published an autobiography entitled 'Roughy: The Autobiography', published with Viking Press.

Notes

External links

1987 births
Living people
Australian rules footballers from Victoria (Australia)
Hawthorn Football Club players
Hawthorn Football Club Premiership players
Gippsland Power players
Leongatha Football Club players
All-Australians (AFL)
Coleman Medal winners
Box Hill Football Club players
People from Leongatha
Australia international rules football team players
Four-time VFL/AFL Premiership players